The Brecksville-Northfield High Level Bridge is a bridge in Greater Cleveland, Ohio, U.S., connecting Brecksville in Cuyahoga County with Sagamore Hills Township in Summit County. It is located in the Cuyahoga Valley National Park.

In 2012, five men were arrested and accused of planning to blow up the bridge. The five were accused of planting what they thought were explosives and attempting to detonate it with a cell phone.  Following guilty pleas and one conviction, the men were sentenced between November 2012 and October 2013.

See also
List of bridges documented by the Historic American Engineering Record in Ohio

References

External links

Brecksville-Northfield High Level Bridge at bridgehunter.com

Bridges completed in 1931
Historic American Engineering Record in Ohio
Road bridges in Ohio
Terrorism in the United States
Transportation in Summit County, Ohio
1931 establishments in Ohio
Concrete bridges in the United States
Open-spandrel deck arch bridges in the United States
Transportation buildings and structures in Cuyahoga County, Ohio
Cuyahoga Valley National Park